Orazio Cambiasi, also Orazio Cambiaso, was an Italian Baroque painter of the Genoese school of the late sixteenth and early seventeenth century.

Cambiasi was born to the painter Luca Cambiaso, who trained him. He specialized in frescos decorative painting grotesques. In 1583 he accompanied Lazzaro Tavarone to Spain, where his father was appointed Painter to the King to King Philip II, and commissioned for the frescoes in the choir of the Royal Monastery of San Lorenzo de El Escorial. He joined his father, Fabrizio Castello, Niccolò Granello, and many others to complete the works. He returned to Genoa in 1585 after the death of his father, where he took up teaching, mentoring among others Giovanni Andrea Ansaldo, Simone Barabino, Giulio Benso, and Giovanni Battista Castello.

References
 Brown, Jonathan, The Hall of Battles of El Escorial: the work of art as a cultural artefact, Ediciones Universidad de Salamanca, 1998, 
 Garcia-Frias Checa, Carmen, "Artists Genoese decorative painting grotesques of the Monastery of San Lorenzo de El Escorial" in Colomer, José Luis, dir., Spain and Genoa: Works, artists and collectors, Madrid, 2004, 
 Newcome, Mary, "Genoese fresco painters in El Escorial" in Giampaolo, Mario, coord., Italian frescoes of El Escorial, Madrid, Electa, 1993, 

Year of birth unknown
Year of death unknown
16th-century Spanish painters
Spanish male painters
Spanish Baroque painters
Painters from Genoa